Vilyuisk Airport  is an airport serving, and located  east of, the urban locality of Vilyuysk, Vilyuysky District, in the Sakha Republic of Russia. It accommodates small transport aircraft.

Airlines and destinations

References

Airports built in the Soviet Union
Airports in the Sakha Republic